The following list includes some of the most significant awards and nominations received by musician Phil Collins as a solo artist.

Grammy Awards

American Music Awards

Brit Awards

Billboard Music Awards

Ivor Novello Awards

MTV Video Music Awards

NRJ Music Awards

|-
| 2002
| Himself
| NRJ Award of Honor
|

Academy Awards

Golden Globe Awards

*Tie with Carly Simon for "Let the River Run" (from Working Girl).

Nickelodeon Kids' Choice Awards

Disney Legends

**Until Anika Noni Rose became a recipient in 2011, Collins held the record for shortest time between his first contribution in 1996, when he first started to write the music for Disney's Tarzan, and being named a Disney Legend in 2002.

Hall of Fame

Royal awards

Honorary degrees

See also
For Genesis, see Awards and nominations received by Genesis.

References

External links
 Phil Collins - Artist - grammy.com
 Winners - Best Performance Music Video - grammy.com
 Hugh Padgham - Artist - grammy.com
 Sammy Nestico - Artist - grammy.com
 Grammy Awards
 American Music Awards History
 Brit Awards (Phil Collins)
 Brit Awards (Hugh Padgham)
 Brit Awards (Buster Soundtrack)
 Winners Database - Billboard Music Awards
 Phil Collins - Awards & Nominations
 The Ivor Novello Awards
 MTV Video Music Awards History
 Academy Awards and Golden Globe Awards
 Hollywood Walk of Fame
 Songwriters Hall of Fame
 Honorary Degree (Fairleigh Dickinson University)
 Honorary Degree Recipients (Berklee College of Music)
 Honorary Degree (McMurry University)
 Honorary Degree (University of Music and Performing Arts Graz)

Collins, Phil
Awards
Collins, Phil